The 2020 Hockey East Men's Ice Hockey Tournament was intended to be played between March 13 and March 21, 2020, at campus locations and at the TD Garden in Boston, Massachusetts.  The tournament would have been the 36th in league history. On March 12, 2020, the tournament was canceled due to the coronavirus pandemic, before any games were played.

Format
Continuing the new format re-introduced in the previous year's tournament, eight of the 11 teams qualified for the 2020 Hockey East tournament. The top four teams in the league standings hosted seeds five through eight on campus in the quarterfinals in the first round of the playoffs, while the remaining teams are eliminated from championship contention.

The four quarterfinal winners are reseeded again as they advance to the TD Garden in Boston for the semifinals and Championship Game.

Standings

Bracket
Teams are reseeded for the Semifinals

Note: * denotes overtime period(s)

References

External links
2020 Hockey East Men's Ice Hockey Tournament

Hockey East Men's Ice Hockey Tournament
Hockey East Men's Ice Hockey Tournament
Hockey East Men's Ice Hockey Tournament
College sports in Massachusetts
Ice hockey in Boston
Hockey East Men's Ice Hockey Tournament
Hockey East Men's Ice Hockey Tournament
Hockey East Men's Ice Hockey Tournament